Mackenzie is a unisex given name. It is derived from the Scottish surname, from the Gaelic "MacCoinnich" (or son of Coinneach, or son of the bright one).

People with the given name
 Mackenzie Astin (b. 1973), American actor
 Mackenzie Blackwood (b. 1996), Canadian professional ice hockey goaltender 
 Mackenzy Bernadeau (b. 1986), American football guard
 MacKenzie Bourg (b. 1992), American singer-songwriter 
 Sir Mackenzie Bowell (1823–1917), English-born Canadian Prime Minister
 Mackenzie Boyd-Clowes (b. 1991), Canadian ski jumper, Olympian
 Mackenzie Brown (b. 1995), American archer
 Mackenzie Crook (b. 1971), British actor
 Mackenzie Davis (b. 1987), Canadian actress
 Mackenzie Dern (b. 1993), Brazilian MMA fighter
 Mackynzie Duggar (b. 2009), daughter of Americans Joshua and Anna Duggar
 Mackenzie Foy (b. 2000), American child model
 McKenzie Grant (1834–1897), Australian politician
 Mackenzie Harvey (b. 2000), Australian cricketer
 Mackenzie McDonald (b. 1995), American tennis player
 McKenzie Milton (born 1997), American football player
 McKenzie Moore (born 1992), American basketball player
 Mackenzie Phillips (b. 1959), American actress
 MacKenzie Porter (b. 1990), Canadian country singer, actress and songwriter.
 Mackenzie Rosman (b. 1989), American actress
 MacKenzie Scott (b. 1970), American novelist, billionaire and philanthropist 
 Mackenzie Skapski (born 1994), goaltending coach and former Canadian professional ice hockey goaltender
 Mackenzie Soldan (b. 1992), American wheelchair basketball and wheelchair tennis player.
 Mackenzie Thorpe (b. 1956), British artist
 Mackenzie Ward (1903–1976), British stage and film actor
 McKenzie Wark (b. 1961), Australian writer
 MacKenzie Weegar (b. 1994), Canadian ice hockey player
 Mackenzee Wittke (b. 2008), Canadian girl 
 Mackenzie Zacharias (b. 1999), Canadian curler
 Mackenzie Ziegler (b. 2004), American dancer, singer, actress, model and social media personality

Fictional
 Mackenzie Allen from Commander in Chief (TV series)
 Mackenzie Boyd, from Emmerdale
 Mackenzie Browning, in the American soap opera The Young and the Restless
 Mackenzie Calhoun, from the Star Trek: New Frontier series
Mackenzie "Mack" Hartford, an Operation Overdrive Red Ranger
 Mackenzie Hollister, from Dork Diaries
 Mackenzie McHale, in the American TV series The Newsroom
 Mackenzie Zales, in the American web series The Most Popular Girls in School
 Mackenzie, a Border Collie in the Australian animated television series ''Bluey

References

English-language unisex given names
Given names originating from a surname
Scottish unisex given names